Valeri Nikolayevich Sinau (10 September 1944 – 18 March 2023) was a Russian professional football coach and a player.

Sinau died in Rostov-on-Don on 18 March 2023, at the age of 78.

References

External links

 Career summary by KLISF

1944 births
2023 deaths
Soviet footballers
Association football defenders
FC SKA Rostov-on-Don players
FC Zorya Luhansk players
FC Mashuk-KMV Pyatigorsk players
PFC Spartak Nalchik players
FC Lokomotiv Moscow players
FC Nyva Vinnytsia players
Soviet football managers
Russian football managers
FC Lada-Tolyatti managers
FC Oryol managers
FC Rostov managers
FC Kuban Krasnodar managers
FC Lokomotiv Nizhny Novgorod managers
FC SKA Rostov-on-Don managers